The 2014 Dutch Darts Masters was the second of eight PDC European Tour events on the 2014 PDC Pro Tour. The tournament took place at the NH Hotel in Veldhoven, Netherlands, between 14–16 February 2014. It featured a field of 48 players and £100,000 in prize money, with £20,000 going to the winner.

Michael van Gerwen won his third European Tour title by beating Mervyn King 6–4 in the final.

Prize money

Qualification and format
The top 16 players from the PDC ProTour Order of Merit on the 17 January 2014 automatically qualified for the event. The remaining 32 places went to players from three qualifying events - 20 from the UK Qualifier (held in Wigan on 19 January), eight from the European Qualifier (held at the venue the day before the event started) and four from the Host Nation Qualifier (held at the venue on 11 February).

The following players took part in the tournament:

Top 16
  Michael van Gerwen (winner) 
  Dave Chisnall (quarter-finals)
  Peter Wright (second round)
  Brendan Dolan (semi-finals)
  Kim Huybrechts (second round)
  Jamie Caven (second round)
  Steve Beaton (second round)
  Wes Newton (quarter-finals)
  Simon Whitlock (second round)
  Mervyn King (runner-up)
  Ian White (semi-finals)
  John Part (second round)
  Paul Nicholson (second round)
  Gary Anderson (second round)
  Adrian Lewis (third round)
  Kevin Painter (third round)

UK Qualifier 
  Stuart Kellett (third round)
  Mick Todd (first round)
  Mickey Mansell (quarter-finals)
  Michael Barnard (first round)
  Andy Smith (second round)
  Kevin Thomas (third round)
  Steve Maish (second round)
  Richie Burnett (third round)
  Terry Jenkins (second round)
  Wayne Jones (first round)
  David Pallett (first round)
  Jamie Lewis (second round)
  Darren Webster (third round)
  Joe Cullen (third round)
  Terry Temple (first round)
  Glenn Spearing (first round)
  Mark Walsh (first round)
  Dean Winstanley (second round)
  Josh Payne (first round)
  Peter Hudson (first round)

European Qualifier
  Jyhan Artut (first round)
  Dimitri Van den Bergh (second round)
  Ronny Huybrechts (second round)
  Fabian Herz (first round)
  Bernd Roith (first round)
  Jarkko Komula (third round)
  Mensur Suljović (first round)
  Max Hopp (first round)

Host Nation Qualifier
  Jelle Klaasen (first round)
  Kevin Voornhout (first round)
  Christian Kist (second round)
  Vincent van der Voort (quarter-finals)

Draw

References

2014 PDC European Tour
2014 in Dutch sport